Emma Katz is a UK-based domestic violence researcher. Katz has contributed to policy and popular cultural discussion on coercive control, in particular in the UK, the United States, and Australia.

Policy

Katz was a member of the expert advisory panel for Research England's Domestic Abuse Policy Guidance for UK Universities 2021.

Award nominations

Media
In March 2020 Katz's research was cited in a Guardian article by Jess Hill on the murder of Hannah Clarke in Brisbane, Australia. In the same month Katz featured in an ITV News report on the Coronation Street coercive control storyline involving the characters Yasmeen Nazir and Geoff Metcalfe. In November 2022 an article published on the Bristol Cable news website included quotes from Katz criticising the use of parental alienation counter-accusations by parents accused of domestic violence or child abuse in family courts.

Footnotes

References

External links
 Katz's Liverpool Hope University profile
 Katz on Twitter
 Katz on Google Scholar
 Katz on ResearchGate
 Katz on Academia.edu

Academics of Liverpool Hope University
Domestic violence academics
Living people
Year of birth missing (living people)